Scuticaria itirapinensis is a species of orchid endemic to Brazil (São Paulo).

References

External links 

itirapinensis
Endemic orchids of Brazil
Orchids of São Paulo (state)